Catalina Sandino Moreno (born 19 April 1981) is a Colombian actress. She shared the Silver Bear with Charlize Theron and received a nomination for the Academy Award for Best Actress for her leading role in Maria Full of Grace (2004). , she stars as Tabitha Matthews in the Epix television series From.

Early life
Sandino Moreno was born in Bogotá, Colombia. She grew up in a middle-class family, her father is a veterinarian and her mother a pathologist. She attended Saint George's School in Bogotá, Colombia. Before becoming an actress, she studied advertising at Pontificia Universidad Javeriana in Bogotá.

Career

2004–2010

In 2003, casting calls for Maria Full of Grace were conducted in both New York and Colombia where she was initially noticed for her talent at the acting school in Bogotá. She was then referred to a casting audition where she beat over 900 girls for the lead role. She left the college to begin her first movie project. Starring Sandino Moreno as  María Alvarez, a Colombian girl who works in a flower plantation when she was pregnant and then as a drug mule. Sandino Moreno's role in this movie was acclaimed, receiving positive feedback from different websites and film critics. This performance made her the first Colombian, the second South American, and third Hispanic actress nominated for an Academy Award. Also, she won the Silver Bear at Berlin International Film Festival shared with Charlize Theron and received a nomination to Screen Actors Guild Award.

In 2005, she moved to New York City to study dramatic arts and for continue with her success career at the moment, and was invited to join AMPAS. In 2006, she played roles in independent film Fast Food Nation with Patricia Arquette, and Paris, je t'aime, where she starred as a young immigrant mother in the segment "Loin du 16e". In 2007, she starred as Hildebranda Sánchez in Love in the Time of Cholera, based in novel of the same name by Gabriel García Márquez, where she appeared alongside Javier Bardem and Fernanda Montenegro.

In 2008, she appeared alongside Benicio del Toro in Steven Soderbergh's Che, playing the role of Aleida March de Guevara, the second wife of Ernesto "Che" Guevara. This film was acclaimed by the critics. She was at the premiere in 2008 Cannes Film Festival. In 2010, she played the role of female Vampire Maria in The Twilight Saga: Eclipse, based on the novel of the same name by Stephenie Meyer.

2010–present

After a break in her career, in November 2013, she  returned in TV roles when it was announced she would play the title role in the forthcoming biopic Castro's Daughter, based on Alina Fernández’s autobiography of the same name. Also she starred in films Roa (2013) and A Most Violent Year (2014) where she appeared with Oscar Isaac and Jessica Chastain. On October 20, 2014, it was announced that she would be joining the final season of Falling Skies in a recurring role as Isabella.

In 2016 she starred in the TV series American Gothic as a recurring character, Christina Morales. In the same year, she returned to the world of cinema in Custody, where she appeared alongside Viola Davis. The film was premiered at the Tribeca Film Festival.

In December 2022, Sandino Moreno was announced to join the John Wick spin-off film "Ballerina" in a unnamed role.

Personal life
Sandino Moreno was one of People magazine's "50 Most Beautiful People" in 2005.

Sandino Moreno met motion picture electrician David Elwell while working on Maria Full of Grace. The couple married on 15 April 2006 in a small ceremony held in Cartagena de Indias.

Filmography

Performer 

 "Que Linda Manita" – 2006 (Paris, je t'aime Soundtrack)

Awards and nominations

See also
 List of actors with Academy Award nominations

References

External links

Photos "Cristiada": Catalina Sandino filming in Durango, México 

1981 births
Colombian film actresses
Independent Spirit Award for Best Female Lead winners
Living people
Actresses from Bogotá
21st-century Colombian actresses
Silver Bear for Best Actress winners
Colombian artists
Pontifical Xavierian University alumni